Aleksandra Stamenić (born 12 June, 1998) is a Serbian handball player for Kisvárdai KC and the Serbian national team.

She represented Serbia at the 2021 World Women's Handball Championship.

References

External links

Serbian female handball players
1998 births
Living people
People from Novi Sad
Expatriate handball players
Serbian expatriate sportspeople in Hungary